"Missed the Boat" is a song by American indie rock band Modest Mouse and is the sixth track on their 2007 album, We Were Dead Before the Ship Even Sank. The song was released as the second single from that album and peaked at #24 in Billboard's Hot Modern Rock Tracks chart.

James Mercer of The Shins sings backup vocals on "Missed the Boat".

Music video
In 2007, Apple Inc. and Modest Mouse asked fans to direct and film a video for the song. The contest ended on May 22, 2007.  Christopher Mills, who also directed the "Float On" video, directed the green screen sequences used in the contest. The winning video, directed by Walter Robot, that is Christopher Louie and Bill Barminski, shows a robot who directed himself in a video about a robot who runs away from home.

Another video, shown on MTV2 and Fuse TV, features segued segments of other submitted videos, with the winning video only appearing for five seconds.

Chart performance

Popular culture
This song appears in the Scrubs episode "My Waste of Time" at the end of the show.

References

External links
 Modest Mouse at MySpace
 

Modest Mouse songs
2007 songs
Songs written by Johnny Marr
Songs written by Isaac Brock (musician)
Songs written by Jeremiah Green
Songs written by Eric Judy
Songs written by Joe Plummer
Songs written by Tom Peloso